Ethelbert Barksdale (January 4, 1824 – February 17, 1893) was a slave owner, a U.S. Representative from Mississippi, and a member of the Confederate States Congress during the American Civil War.

Biography
Barksdale was born in Smyrna, Tennessee, to William Barksdale and Nancy Hervey Lester. He was the younger brother of William Barksdale, a Confederate general who was killed at the Battle of Gettysburg during the Civil War. Ethelbert Barksdale moved to Jackson, Mississippi, as a young man and later adopted journalism as a profession. He edited the official journal of the state from 1854 to 1861 and again in 1876–1883, served as editor of the Jackson Clarion, has been active in Democratic Party politics, and earned the moniker, the Sir Robert Peel, of Mississippi.

He strongly advocated for Mississippi's secession from the Union at the start of the Civil War.

During the Civil War, he served as member of the First Confederate Congress and then the Second Confederate Congress from 1861 to 1865.

Near the war's end, in an effort to provide recruits for the Confederate States Army, Barksdale introduced legislation that would permit "Negroes" to fight for the South against the Union, a measure supported by Robert E. Lee. Initially it passed the Confederate House, was barely defeated in the Senate, but weeks later, a version of this "last resort" effort was eventually approved, though never implemented.

Returning to politics in postbellum Mississippi during Reconstruction, Barksdale served as delegate to the Democratic National Conventions in 1860, 1868, 1872, and 1880. He served as chairman of the Democratic State executive committee from 1877 to 1879.

Barksdale was elected as a Democrat to the Forty-eighth and Forty-ninth Congresses (March 4, 1883 – March 3, 1887). He was an unsuccessful candidate for renomination in 1886, and then engaged in agricultural pursuits in Yazoo County.

He died in Yazoo City, Mississippi, on February 17, 1893, and was interred in Greenwood Cemetery, Jackson, Mississippi.

Family
In 1843 he married Alice-Jane Harris (1826–1906) and they had three children.

References

External links

1824 births
1893 deaths
People from Smyrna, Tennessee
American people of English descent
Democratic Party members of the United States House of Representatives from Mississippi
Members of the Confederate House of Representatives from Mississippi
Politicians from Jackson, Mississippi
People from Yazoo City, Mississippi
Mississippi lawyers
19th-century American lawyers